The term cavalry wing in military history was used to refer to the cavalry units positioned on either of the army flanks when deployed for battle, predominantly during the period from the Middle Ages to the French Revolutionary Wars. 

In the British Army the term also referred to The British Cavalry Wing, an administrative division of the army that grouped horse-mounted cavalry units until amalgamation with the Royal Tank Corps on 4 April 1939 to create the Royal Armoured Corps.

The Romans used the term Ala, meaning wing, to denote their major cavalry units.

References

Cavalry units and formations